In the Land of Women is a 2007 American romantic comedy-drama film directed and written by Jon Kasdan. The film premiered in the United States on April 20, 2007.

Plot

Carter Webb is a young, soft-core writer living in Los Angeles whose young, starlet girlfriend Sofia breaks up with him.

Carter soon after goes to be his supposedly dying grandmother's carer in Michigan, partly to try to heal and also write.

Upon arrival, grandma Phyllis doesn't initially recognize him, but once she does, and lets him in, he sees that she does need help. She hasn't been eating properly nor keeping the house tidy. After a few brief phone calls with his mother and his boss, Carter begins to clean up his grandmother's home.

Meanwhile, across the street, Paige and Lucy return home from school. Their mother Sarah calls Lucy to the kitchen and hesitantly tells her that she has found a lump in her breast. Shocked, she wants to go with her mother when she receives her results, but Sarah quickly refuses.

Lucy watches Carter take out the huge bags of trash, snickering. Before he can talk to her, Sarah hears the noise and comes outside with their dog, Bozo, warmly introducing herself. They have a brief talk before Lucy's friends arrive loudly down the road and Sarah goes back inside. Lucy and Carter meet, and she asks Carter not to tell her parents that she smokes.

The next morning, Sarah arrives at Carter's doorstep, bringing cookies and inviting him to walk the dog. They chat about their lives. Carter eventually mentioning Sofia, wondering about his love for her. He believes that love letters he has written for Sofia contain his best work.

Once Sarah returns home, she asks Lucy to invite Carter out to take his mind off Sofia, but she refuses, and her husband agrees. Sarah abruptly leaves the room, frustrated, going to her bathroom to take some painkillers.

The next day, while on a run, Carter has flashbacks of all the memorable times he had with Sofia:  their first kiss, and so on, until the breakup. When she utters the word "goodbye" once more, Carter runs into a tree and passes out. When he wakes up, Lucy is standing over him. She gives him a ride home and then invites him to a movie. Carter tells her to ask her parents permission to take him out on a school night, as they normally would not. Lucy, agrees, and goes back inside.

Shortly thereafter, Sarah invites Carter on another walk. This time, she leads him into a small patch of forest. She admits that her husband is having an affair and that she does not love him – at least not the way Carter loved Sofia. They hug and leave to run errands together. They share an awkward moment of both having something to say to the other; Carter begins with the declaration that Sarah's husband is "out of his mind". Sarah smiles, and dismisses what she has to say. Eventually, the two deepen their friendship and later, when she tells him about the cancer, they kiss.

Carter goes to the movies with Lucy and Paige. He finds out that his ex has been dating Colin Farrell. Afterward, Lucy brings Carter to a football field because he was curious about the typical high school experience. There she confesses that she is sort of dating the high school quarterback Gabe, who is arrogant and cocky, but that they have not kissed yet. They also talk about Gabe's best friend Eric who seems to be the opposite of Gabe; soft and shy. She also confesses that she knows her father is having an affair, but believes her mother does not know.

Lucy convinces Carter to come to a party with her for support after discovering that Gabe hooked up with her best friend. During the party, Gabe tries to fight him, but Eric steps in saying that Gabe is the one who screwed up. After the party, Carter and Lucy share a kiss which Sarah sees. She tells Carter to leave Lucy alone and to never speak to them again. Some days later, he leaves her a letter.

Lucy goes to see Carter, who tells her that he is not the guy for her and that if she thought about it, she would realize who is. Sarah gets her cancer treatments and finds out that everything will be all right. Sarah and Lucy talk and start to heal their relationship. As Lucy drives home from the hospital, she stops to see Eric who she realizes is the guy. Sarah finally reads Carter's letter which, though similar to a love letter, is more of a "thank you" note.

Carter comes downstairs to find his grandmother has died but does not immediately call hospice. Instead, he goes outside for some air and sees Sarah. She apologizes and they are able to end their friendship on good terms.

The story closes with Carter back in Los Angeles at the diner where Sofia broke up with him. He is writing a script about his grandmother. Talking to the waitress he seems to be getting on with his life without Sofia.

Cast

Reception

Commercial
The film was released April 20, 2007 in the United States and grossed US$4.7 million in 2,155 theaters in its opening weekend, coming in eighth at the U.S. box office. The film stayed in theaters for 10 weeks and went on to gross $11 million in the U.S., with a combined worldwide gross of $17.5 million. The gross exceeded the film's $10 million budget, making it a moderate box office success.

Critical
The film received mixed reviews. As of September 2007 on the review aggregator Rotten Tomatoes, 44% of critics gave the film positive reviews, based on 117 reviews (51 "fresh", 67 "rotten"). The critical consensus states, "While pleasantly acted, In the Land of Women is a dramatically stilted film with underdeveloped characters". On Metacritic, the film had an average score of 47 out of 100 based on 29 reviews.

Soundtrack

References

External links 
 
 
 
 
 
 Adam Brody Seduces Chicago on ‘In the Land of Women’, MidwestBusiness.com, 4/17/07
 In the Land of Women Review at Recenzenci.pl (PL)

2007 comedy-drama films
2007 films
American comedy-drama films
Castle Rock Entertainment films
2000s English-language films
Films scored by Stephen Trask
Films produced by Steve Golin
Films set in Michigan
Films shot in Vancouver
Warner Bros. films
2007 directorial debut films
Films with screenplays by Jonathan Kasdan
Films about mother–daughter relationships
2000s American films